The Santa Barbara School is a historic school building in the Martineztown-Santa Barbara neighborhood of Albuquerque, New Mexico. Built in phases between 1908 and 1930, it is one of the city's oldest surviving school buildings and is notable for its association with Atanasio Montoya, a noted educator who reformed and modernized the Bernalillo County school system in the early 20th century. The school was added to the New Mexico State Register of Cultural Properties and the National Register of Historic Places in 1989.

History
The Santa Barbara School was established there in 1908 as part of Bernalillo County school district 13, which also included the schools at Old Town and Duranes. The original two-room schoolhouse was constructed of adobe with a stone foundation; a third room was added at some point in the subsequent decade. In 1912 the Bernalillo County schools were taken over by a new superintendent, Atanasio Montoya, who is credited with modernizing the county school system. Under Montoya's tenure the school was expanded again in 1919. This addition, designed by architect E. H. Norris, added one large room with a folding partition to the south side of the school, separated from the three older classrooms by a central hall. In this configuration the building was similar in layout to the Old Armijo School which is still standing in the South Valley.

The school was expanded still further in 1924, adding a second large partitionable room to the south side and adding the distinctive Mission style curved parapet. Prior to this project, the school was reportedly so crowded that even the hallway was being used for classes. Two other additions were constructed at the back of the building around 1926 and 1930, respectively. However, declining populations in the Martineztown area saw the enrollment at Santa Barbara drop from 232 to 139 between 1930 and 1940. In the late 1940s District 13 was taken over by Albuquerque Public Schools, whose nearby Longfellow Elementary was also experiencing declining enrollment. By 1952 Santa Barbara was down to just eight full-time teachers, and it closed completely in 1971. APS continued to use the building for auxiliary purposes until 1986, then sold it to the city of Albuquerque in 1988. The school was then renovated into housing for senior citizens in 1991.

Architecture
The Santa Barbara School is a one-story building of varied materials, with sections of adobe, brick, and concrete block construction. It is designed in a simplified Mission Revival style, with stuccoed walls, arched doorways, and curvilinear parapets, which conceal a partially hipped and partially flat roof. The school is organized around a central hallway extending nearly the full length of the building with classrooms on either side, and the exterior is generally symmetrical about this axis. Most of the windows are 6-over-6 sashes grouped in threes.

References

School buildings on the National Register of Historic Places in New Mexico
Schools in Albuquerque, New Mexico
Public elementary schools in New Mexico
School buildings completed in 1908
New Mexico State Register of Cultural Properties
National Register of Historic Places in Albuquerque, New Mexico
1908 establishments in New Mexico Territory
Defunct schools in New Mexico
Residential buildings in Albuquerque, New Mexico